The Babuza (formerly incorrectly called 貓霧捒族; pinyin: Māowùshùzú) are a Taiwanese aboriginal people, living primarily in Changhua County and around the western part of Taiwan's Central Basin.

References

See also
Babuza language
Kingdom of Middag
 Taiwanese indigenous peoples

Taiwanese indigenous peoples